Juventus Football Club is an Italian professional association football club based in Turin, Piedmont. The club was founded as Sport-Club Juventus in late 1897 by pupils from the Massimo d'Azeglio Lyceum school in Turin, among them the brothers Eugenio and Enrico Canfari, but were renamed as Foot-Ball Club Juventus two years later. The club joined the Italian Football Championship in 1900. In 1904, the businessman Ajmone-Marsan revived the finances of the football club Juventus, making it also possible to transfer the training field from Piazza d'armi to the more appropriate Velodrome Umberto I. During this period, the team wore a pink and black kit. Juventus first won the league championship in 1905 while playing at their Velodrome Umberto I ground. By this time the club colours had changed to black and white stripes, inspired by English side Notts County.

Juventus is the most successful club in Italian football and one of the most awarded globally. Overall, Juventus has won 70 official titles on the national and international stage, more than any other Italian club: 36 official league titles, 14 Coppa Italia titles, nine Supercoppa Italiana titles, being the record holder in all these competitions; and, with 11 titles in confederation and inter-confederation competitions (two Intercontinental Cups, two European Champion Clubs' Cup/UEFA Champions Leagues, one European Cup Winners' Cup, three UEFA Cups, one UEFA Intertoto Cup and two UEFA Super Cups), the club ranks sixth in Europe and twelfth in the world with the most trophies won.

Under the first spell of headcoach Giovanni Trapattoni (1976–1986), the Torinese club won thirteen trophies in the ten years before 1986 (including six league titles, two national cup titles and five international titles) and became the first to win all three competitions organised by the UEFA: the European Champions' Cup, Cup Winners' Cup and UEFA Cup. With successive triumphs in the 1984 European Super Cup and 1985 Intercontinental Cup, the club became the first, and thus far, the first and only in association football history, to have won all possible confederation competitions, an achievement that it revalidated with the title won in the 1999 UEFA Intertoto Cup. This record has been valid until the conclusion of the first edition of the UEFA Europa Conference League in May 2022. Under the management of Marcello Lippi (1994–1999 and 2001–2004), the club had its second most successful cycle with five league titles and three international titles, along with a one Coppa Italia title, four Supercoppa Italiana titles and four further European finals, one UEFA Cup final and three Champions League finals (1996–97, 1997–98, 2002–03).

In May 2006, Juventus became one of the five clubs linked to a 2006 Italian football scandal, the result of which saw the club relegated to Serie B for the first time in its history, as well as being stripped of the two league titles won under Fabio Capello in 2005 and 2006. After returning to Serie A in the 2007–08 season, Juventus appointed Claudio Ranieri as manager and finished third and second in the following two years league. After two consecutive 7th-place finishes (its worst placement since 1954–57) and for the first time since the 1991–92 season, excluding the seasons 2006–07 and 2007–08 after the Calciopoli scandal, out of European competitions, newly Juventus chairmen Andrea Agnelli appointed former player Antonio Conte as manager in 2011, the same year the club relocated to the new Juventus Stadium. Conte led Juventus to his first three league titles of the 2010s, including an unbeaten league title in 2012 and achieved a record 102 points and 33 wins in the 2013–14 season.

Following Conte's resignment, Massimiliano Allegri was appointed as manager and led Juventus to a national double in his first year. In the 2015–16 season, the club won their 5th straight title (and 32nd overall) since last winning five straight between 1930–31 and 1934–35, after climbing from 12th place and taking 73 points of a possible 75. The club also became the first team in Italy's history to complete Serie A and Coppa Italia doubles in back-to-back seasons. In the 2016–17 season, the club won their 12th Coppa Italia title, becoming the first team to win three consecutive championships. Juventus also secured their sixth consecutive league title, establishing an all-time record of successive triumphs in the competition. Juventus won their 13th Coppa Italia title, and fourth in a row, extending the all-time record of successive Coppa Italia titles. Four days later on 13 May, Juventus secured their seventh consecutive Serie A title, extending the all-time record of successive triumphs in the competition. On 20 April 2019, Juventus secured their eighth consecutive Serie A title, with Allegri departing Juventus at the end of the season. A year later, on 26 July 2020, the club secured a ninth consecutive title under new manager Maurizio Sarri, pushing their unprecedented record to new heights. On 2 May 2021, under new manager Andrea Pirlo, Juventus' run of nine consecutive titles was mathematically ended by Internazionale, who were confirmed as champions. Pirlo's experience ended in late May and Allegri retruned sitting on Juventus' bench. After losing the 2022 Coppa Italia Final to Internazionale, Juventus ended the 2021–22 season trophyless for the first time after ten years.

Key 

 CL = UEFA Champions League
 EC = European Cup
 EL = UEFA Europa League
 UC = UEFA Cup
 ICFC = Inter-Cities Fairs Cup
 UIC = UEFA Intertoto Cup
 CWC = European Cup Winners' Cup
 ESC = European Super Cup
 USC = UEFA Super Cup
 IC = Intercontinental Cup
 CDA = Cup of the Alps
 AIC = Anglo-Italian Cup
 MIT = Mitropa Cup
 AMI = Coppa dell'Amicizia
 LC = Latin Cup
 CR = Copa Rio
 TP = Memorial Armando Picchi

 Pld = Matches played
 W = Matches won
 D = Matches drawn
 L = Matches lost
 GF = Goals for
 GA = Goals against
 Pts = Points
 Pos = Final position

 F = Final
 SF = Semi-finals
 QF = Quarter-finals
 R16 = Round of 16
 R32 = Round of 32
 GS = Group stage
 GS2 = Second group stage
 N/A = Did not qualify
 – = Tournament did not occur

 QR1 = First qualifying round
 QR2 = Second qualifying round
 QR3 = Third qualifying round
 QR4 = Fourth qualifying round
 RInt = Intermediate round
 R1 = Round 1
 R2 = Round 2
 R3 = Round 3
 R4 = Round 4
 R5 = Round 5
 R6 = Round 6

Seasons 
The first official national football tournament was organised in 1898 by the Italian Football Federation (Italian: Federazione Italiana del Football – FIF, before changing its name in Federazione Italiana Giuoco Calcio – FIGC by 1909).

In the following years, the tournament (called Prima Categoria) was structured into regional groups, with the winners of each group participating in a playoff with the eventual winners being declared champions. From 1921 to 1926, Prima Divisione was founded as the first level of the Italian Football Championship. Regarding to the dispute between major clubs and FIGC, Divisione Nazionale was created in the following three years as the new national top league where Northern and Southern teams played in the same championship from 1926 to 1929. In 1929, Divisione Nazionale (two groups of 16 teams each) split into two championships: Divisione Nazionale Serie A (the new Top Division) and Divisione Nazionale Serie B (the new second level of Italian Football).

In the current format of Serie A, the Italian Football Championship was revised from having regional and interregional rounds to a single-tier league from the 1929–30 season onward.

 1. For details of league structure, see Italian football league system.
 2. The first edition was held in 1922, but the second champions were not crowned until 1936.
 3. The first edition was held in 1988 (played in 1989).
 4. Only league goals are counted. The Serie A Golden Boot known as capocannoniere (plural: capocannonieri) is the award given to the highest goalscorer in Serie A.
 5. Juventus was the first team in association football history to adopt a star to their badge to represent their tenth league title in 1958. The star was later formally adopted as a symbol and increased for every ten titles. Juventus currently has three stars above their Scudetto badge since the 2015–16 season.
 6. In 2014–15 season, Juventus won their tenth Coppa Italia title and adopted the Coppa Italia badge to the opposite side of the Scudetto badge the following season.

Doubles and Trebles
 Doubles:
 Serie A and Coppa Italia: 6
 1959–60; 1994–95; 2014–15; 2015–16; 2016–17 and 2017–18 seasons
 Serie A and UEFA Cup Winners' Cup: 1
 1983–84 season
 Serie A and UEFA Cup: 1
  1976–77 season
 Coppa Italia and UEFA Cup: 1
  1989–90 season
 Trebles:
 European Treble (UEFA Cup, European Cup Winners' Cup, European Cup): 1
 1976–77 UEFA Cup, 1983–84 European Cup Winners' Cup, 1984–85 European Cup
 Italian Treble (Supercoppa Italiana, Serie A, Coppa Italia): 1
 2015–16 season

See also 
 List of unbeaten football club seasons

Notes

References

Bibliography

Other publications 

 

 
Seasons
Juventus